Wilson da Silva Piazza (born 25 February 1943 in Ribeirão das Neves), is a former Brazilian footballer. He played as defensive midfielder and centre-back, in particular with Cruzeiro E.C. and the Brazil national team. He was a member of the Brazilian team that won the 1970 World Cup. He was a member of the Cruzeiro team which won the 1976 Copa Libertadores.

National team
Piazza made 51 appearances for the Brazil national team between 1967 and 1975. He played for them in both the 1970 and 1974 World Cups, appearing in six games in 1970, including the final.

Honours
Cruzeiro E.C.
 Taça Brasil: 1966
 Copa Libertadores 1976
 Campeonato Mineiro (Minas Gerais State championship): 1965, 1966, 1967, 1968, 1969, 1972, 1973, 1974, 1975, 1977

International
Brazil
 FIFA World Cup: 1970

Individual
 Brazilian Silver Ball: 1972

References

1943 births
Brazilian footballers
Brazilian people of Italian descent
Living people
Association football midfielders
Association football defenders
1970 FIFA World Cup players
1974 FIFA World Cup players
1975 Copa América players
FIFA World Cup-winning players
Cruzeiro Esporte Clube players
Brazil international footballers
Sportspeople from Minas Gerais